San Mateo  (pronounced locally as /sænˈmäCHō/ not /sæn mə-tay-oh/ , Spanish for St. Matthew), officially the Municipality of San Mateo, is a 1st class municipality in the province of Isabela, Philippines. According to the 2020 census, it has a population of 66,663 people.

San Mateo is one of the cleanest town in the region. The administrators encourage the people of the municipality to use paper bags instead of plastic bags in line with its claim as an "Agro-Ecological Town".

According to the 2020 Cities and Municipalities Competitiveness Index conducted by the National Competitiveness Council, San Mateo took the 141st spot among the first class and second class municipalities in the Philippines.

2015 44th
2016 99th
2017 123rd
2018 92nd
2019 72nd
2020 141st
2021 292nd
2022 242nd

History

First named as "Marasat", it was a former barangay of Cauayan, then Santiago. It was called the Municipality of Yoshisawa under the government of the Japanese Imperial Army during the Second World War. After the liberation, it was finally created and named San Mateo by virtue of Presidential Executive Order No. 97 on March 17, 1946, by then President Sergio Osmeña. It was proclaimed as the Agro-Ecological Destination in Cagayan Valley by President Gloria Macapagal Arroyo by virtue of Presidential Proclamation No. 1685 dated December 1, 2008. Then it was also proclaimed as the Munggo Capital of the Philippines in the year 2008–2009.

MAYORS OF SAN MATEO, ISABELA

1942 Doroteo Barbero

1943 Estanislao Bueno

1946 Don Mateo Cadeliña

1946 - 1951 Cornelio Alipio

1951 - 1955 Don Mateo Cadeliña

1955 - 1960 Marcelo Santiago

1960 - 1962 Hermogenes Ramil

1962 - 1963 Braulio Lucas

1963 - 1986 Severo Lachica

1986 - 1998 Dr. Venancio Villarta

1998 - 2001 Feliciano Palomares

2001 - 2010 Roberto Agcaoili

2010 - 2019 Dra. Crispina Agcaoili

2019–Present Atty. Gregorio Pua

Geography 
San Mateo is situated in the Southwestern part of Isabela. It is bounded on the north by Aurora, on the northeast by Cabatuan, on the east by Cauayan, on the east-southeast by Alicia, on the south by Ramon and on the west Alfonso Lista in the Province of Ifugao.

It has a total area of approximately 12,059.83 hectares.

Barangays
San Mateo is politically subdivided into 33 barangays. These barangays are headed by elected officials: Barangay Captain, Barangay Council, whose members are called Barangay Councilors. All are elected every three years.

Climate

The climate of San Mateo falls under third type. This type of climate is characterized by no pronounced maximum rain period with a short dry season lasting from one to three months. Rainfall starts in July and continues through December with either October or November as the peak of the rainy season.

As per data gathered from the ISU PAG-ASA PCARRD AGROMET Station, Echague, Isabela, the average monthly rainfall for 2011 was 238.20mm with the highest recorded at 558.20mm in September and at least in March with 32.6mm. The highest recorded temperature was its peak in May at 34.40C during the summer season and the lowest at 26.10C in January. However the average temperature for the same period was 30.70C.

Land Classification and Uses

The soil type of San Mateo is 49.89% Santa Rita Clay Loam which is suited for lowland crops like rice, tobacco and mungo. Other soil types are Bago Series (26.04%), San Manuel Series (9.87%), Peñaranda (2.31%), Agustin Series (7.95%) and River Wash Gravel (3.95%).

The existing land uses of the municipality are as follows:

The long and mighty Magat River, the biggest tributary of the Cagayan River lies in the vast plains devoted to agriculture in the area.

The Tao-Tao River and the four (4) creeks found in the municipality named Porvida, Gaddanan, Macañao and Balaobao are likewise tapped to supply water to elevated portions of agricultural lands through the use of water pumps.

Topography

The terrain of the municipality is basically plain with 98% of the total land area under 0-2 percent slope category and only 2% of the total area is under the 2.3-5 percent slope category. The excellent topography of the municipality has made irrigation by gravity method applicable in flooding of rice paddies.

Demographics

Language
The population is a combination of different ethnic group dominated by Ilocano speaking people which make Ilocano the common language used in the municipality.

Economy

Culture
 March 17 - Town Fiesta
 1st week of May - Munggo Festival

Government

Local government
The municipality is governed by a mayor designated as its local chief executive and by a municipal council as its legislative body in accordance with the Local Government Code. The mayor, vice mayor, and the councilors are elected directly by the people through an election which is being held every three years.

Elected officials

Congress representation
San Mateo, belonging to the third legislative district of the province of Isabela, currently represented by Hon. Ian Paul L. Dy.

Healthcare
 BBCSS Pediatric Medical And Surgical Clinic
 Juvelo Family Clinic
 New Samaritan Medical And Pediatric Clinic
 Piedad Medical Clinic
 Ricafort Clinic
 San Mateo Integrated Community Hospital
 San Mateo Kidney Care and Dialysis Center
 San Mateo Multicare Hospital
 San Mateo Rural Health Unit

Education
The Schools Division of Isabela governs the town's public education system. The division office is a field office of the DepEd in Cagayan Valley region. The office governs the public and private elementary and public and private high schools throughout the municipality.

Colleges and Universities
 Isabela State University (San Mateo Campus)
 Eveland Christian College
 Cagayan Valley Automotive and Technical School Inc.

High school
 Eveland Christian College
 La Salette Of San Mateo, Inc.
 Salinungan National High School
 Salinungan Stand Alone Senior High School
 San Mateo General Comprehensive High School
 San Mateo National High School
 San Mateo Vocational Industrial High School

Elementary

References

External links
 
 San Mateo at the Isabela Government Website
 Local Governance Performance Management System
 [ Philippine Standard Geographic Code]
 Philippine Census Information
  Municipal Profile at the National Competitiveness Council of the Philippines

Municipalities of Isabela (province)
Establishments by Philippine executive order